Aguilas De Tabasco is a Mexican football club that plays in the Tercera División de México. The club is based in Villahermosa, Tabasco, México.

The club is an affiliate of Liga MX side Club América for the Tabasco state. It won only one of its first 25 matches in the 2009–10 Tercera División, Group I season, and suffered a heavy 6–0 defeat to Petroleros. The club was suspended by the FMF following financial problems in the 2010–11 season, but was re-admitted to the Tercera División, Group I for the 2011–12 season.

See also
Football in Mexico

References

External links

Villahermosa
Football clubs in Tabasco
Association football clubs established in 1981
1981 establishments in Mexico